Emma Stenning (born 1975, in Surrey) is a British arts professional, currently based in Toronto, where she has been the Executive Director of Soulpepper Theatre since November 2018.

Career
Stenning was previously Chief Executive of Bristol Old Vic, leading the organisation in partnership with Tom Morris.  Between 2009 and 2018 the pair delivered the long-awaited £26m capital refurbishment of the grade 1 listed theatre, restoring the Georgian auditorium, and developing a new, award-winning (RIBA National Award), front of house and studio designed by architects Haworth Tompkins. During this time, Stenning and Morris successfully revitalised Bristol Old Vic's creative life and public profile, whilst developing the organisation's offer as a heritage tourism destination and social hub for the city.

Previous to Bristol, Stenning was Head of Producing for the 2009 Manchester International Festival, where she delivered a number of world premieres including Rufus Wainwright's opera Prima Donna and the London transfer of Damon Albarn's Monkey.

Her past roles include Head of Theatre at Arts Council England, London; and Cultural Programme Advisor at the London Organising Committee for the Olympic Games, where she was responsible for the initial feasibility planning for the stadium ceremonies.

From 2002 to 2005 she was Executive Director of BAC, again in partnership with Tom Morris as Artistic Director.  She has worked with Complicite, Headlong and the RSC, producing theatre on the London fringe, in the West End, and on national and international tour.

Stenning was formerly Deputy Chair of Shakespeare's Globe, and now serves on the company's US board. She was Chair of the Bike Shed Theatre and a trustee of Headlong and Cheek by Jowl.  She was a Clore Fellow, winner of the Clore Prize and voted by the Cultural Leadership Programme as a Woman to Watch.

In 2017, Stenning was made an honorary Doctor of Letters by Bristol University.

References

Living people
Theatre people from Bristol
British theatre managers and producers
Women theatre managers and producers
Alumni of the University of Cambridge
1975 births